Arkansas Highway 224 (AR 224, Hwy. 224) is a designation for two east–west state highways in Jackson County, Arkansas. A northern route of  runs east from Highway 367 to the city limits of Swifton. A second route of  begins at US Route 67 (US 67) and runs to Highway 14 after serving as a frontage road of US 67.

Route description

Tuckerman to Swifton
Highway 224 begins at Highway 367 near Tuckerman and runs east. The route turns north and crosses over Highway 226 and a temporary designation of US 67 until the Arkansas State Highway and Transportation Department (AHTD) completes a new freeway alignment for US 67. Slightly north of this alignment, the route terminates at the Swifton south city limits. The average daily traffic counts from the AHTD for 2010 show that a maximum of about 610 vehicles per day (VPD) use the portion near Swifton, with the count dropping to 180 VPD for portions further south.

US 67 (Future I-57) to Highway 14
Highway 224 begins at an exit along US 67 (Future I-57) and runs east through Ingleside. The route turns north to run along US 67 as a frontage road until it terminates at Highway 14. The terminus is very near another exit along US 67 south of Newport. Traffic counts from the AHTD in 2010 indicate that the average daily traffic volume on this segment of Highway 101 is at a maximum of 150 VPD near the US 67/AR 14 terminus and decreases as you travel further south.

Major intersections

|-
| align=center colspan=5 | Highway 224 begins at US 67 (Future I-57)
|-

References

224
Transportation in Jackson County, Arkansas